William Darke (24 July 1846 – 24 January 1925) was an Australian cricketer. He played one first-class cricket match for Victoria in 1871.

See also
 List of Victoria first-class cricketers

References

1846 births
1925 deaths
Australian cricketers
Victoria cricketers
Cricketers from Sydney